Passiflora amoena is a species of plant in the family Passifloraceae. It is endemic to lowland forests of Guyana and French Guiana, distinguished by its coriaceous pink flowers with a triangle-shaped outer corona.

References

amoena
Endemic flora of French Guiana
Taxa named by Linda Katherine Escobar